The 2022–23 UEFA Europa League group stage began on 8 September 2022 and ended on 3 November 2022. A total of 32 teams competed in the group stage to decide 16 of the 24 places in the knockout phase of the 2022–23 UEFA Europa League.

Bodø/Glimt, Nantes, Union Berlin and Union Saint-Gilloise made their debut appearances in the Europa League group stage. Union Saint-Gilloise made their debut appearance in a UEFA competition group stage.

A total of 23 national associations were represented in the group stage.

Draw 
The draw for the group stage was held on 26 August 2022 in Istanbul, Turkey. The 32 teams were drawn into eight groups of four. For the draw, the teams were seeded into four pots, each of eight teams, based on their 2022 UEFA club coefficients. Teams from the same association could not be drawn into the same group. Prior to the draw, UEFA formed pairings of teams from the same association, including those playing in the Europa Conference League group stage (one pairing for associations with two or three teams, two pairings for associations with four or five teams), based on television audiences, where one team was drawn into Groups A–D and another team was drawn into Groups E–H, so that the two teams would have different kick-off times. The following pairings were announced by UEFA after the group stage teams were confirmed (the second team in a pairing marked by UECL played in the Europa Conference League group stage):

 A  Roma and Lazio
 B  Manchester United and Arsenal
 C  Red Star Belgrade and Partizan (UECL)
 D  Dynamo Kyiv and Dnipro-1 (UECL)
 E  Feyenoord and PSV Eindhoven
 F  Rennes and Monaco
 G  Real Sociedad and Real Betis
 H  Malmö FF and Djurgårdens IF (UECL)
 I  Midtjylland and Silkeborg (UECL)
 J  Bodø/Glimt and Molde (UECL)
 K  Union Berlin and SC Freiburg
 L  Fenerbahçe and Trabzonspor
 M  Nantes and Nice (UECL)
 N  Sturm Graz and Austria Wien (UECL)
 O  AEK Larnaca and Omonia
 P  Zürich and Basel (UECL)

Teams
Below were the participating teams (with their 2022 UEFA club coefficients), grouped by their seeding pot. They included:
12 teams which entered in this stage
10 winners of the play-off round
6 losers of the Champions League play-off round (4 from Champions Path, 2 from League Path)
4 League Path losers of the third qualifying round

Notes

Format
In each group, teams played against each other home-and-away in a round-robin format. The winners of each group advanced to the round of 16, while the runners-up advanced to the knockout round play-offs. The third-placed teams were transferred to the Europa Conference League knockout round play-offs, while the fourth-placed teams were eliminated from European competitions for the season.

Tiebreakers
Teams were ranked according to points (3 points for a win, 1 point for a draw, 0 points for a loss). If two or more teams were tied on points, the following tiebreaking criteria was applied, in the order given, to determine the rankings (see Article 16 Equality of points – group stage, Regulations of the UEFA Europa League):
Points in head-to-head matches among the tied teams;
Goal difference in head-to-head matches among the tied teams;
Goals scored in head-to-head matches among the tied teams;
If more than two teams were tied, and after applying all head-to-head criteria above, a subset of teams were still tied, all head-to-head criteria above were reapplied exclusively to this subset of teams;
Goal difference in all group matches;
Goals scored in all group matches;
Away goals scored in all group matches;
Wins in all group matches;
Away wins in all group matches;
Disciplinary points (direct red card = 3 points; double yellow card = 3 points; single yellow card = 1 point);
UEFA club coefficient.
Due to the abolition of the away goals rule, head-to-head away goals were no longer applied as a tiebreaker starting from last season. However, total away goals were still applied as a tiebreaker.

Groups
The fixtures were announced on 27 August 2022, the day after the draw. The matches were played on 8 September, 15 September, 6 October, 13 October, 27 October and 3 November 2022. The scheduled kick-off times were 18:45 and 21:00 CET/CEST.

Times are CET/CEST, as listed by UEFA (local times, if different, are in parentheses).

Group A

Group B

Group C

Group D

Group E

Group F

Group G

Group H

Notes

References

External links

2
2022–23
September 2022 sports events in Europe
October 2022 sports events in Europe
November 2022 sports events in Europe